The Garin Death Ray, also known as The Death Box and The Hyperboloid of Engineer Garin, is a science fiction novel by the noted Russian author Aleksey Nikolayevich Tolstoy written in 1926–1927. Vladimir Nabokov, who included parodic elements in his tragicomedy The Waltz Invention (1938), considered it Tolstoy's finest fictional work.

The "hyperboloid" in its title is not a geometrical surface (though it is utilized in the device design) but a "death ray"-laser-like device (thought up by the author many decades before lasers were invented) that the protagonist, engineer Garin, used to fight his enemies and try to become the dictator of the world. The idea of a "death ray" (popularized in The War of the Worlds by H. G. Wells, among others) was commonplace in science fiction of the time, but Tolstoy's version is unique for its level of technical details. "Hyperboloids" of different power capability differ in their effect. The device uses two hyperbolic mirrors (in contrast to Wells's Heat-Ray, which uses a parabolic mirror) to concentrate light rays in a parallel beam. Larger "hyperboloids" can destroy military ships on the horizon, and those of less power can only injure people and cut electric cables on walls of rooms.

Influence 

Charles H. Townes, the inventor of laser, said that his invention had been inspired by this novel.

The film adaptations of the novel were released in the Soviet Union in 1965 (The Hyperboloid of Engineer Garin) and 1973 (Failure of Engineer Garin).

The Soviet rock band Kino was originally known as Garin i giperboloydy (Garin and the hyperboloids).

The Estonian punk band Vennaskond has a song "Insener Garini hüperboloid" (1993) (The Hyperboloid of Engineer Garin in Estonian).

The Russian band Piknik has a song "Гиперболоид" (Hyperboloid) (2008).

References

External links 
 , 1965 movie
 , 1973 movie
 Brief movie info page – in Russian, with pictures
 2006 DVD release – RUSCICO Offers Russian and English subtitles and various features

1927 science fiction novels
1927 Russian novels
Novels by Alexei Tolstoy
Soviet science fiction novels
Methuen Publishing books